The Women's 10 metre air pistol event at the 2008 Olympic Games took place on August 10 at the Beijing Shooting Range Hall. Natalia Paderina of Russia set a new Olympic record in the qualification round with 391 points out of 400, but entering the final Guo Wenjun was only one point behind and through the last ten shots emerged as the winner. After the competition, Paderina (silver) and Georgian veteran Nino Salukvadze (bronze) posed together; Salukvadze took the opportunity to take a stand for a peaceful solution.

The event consisted of two rounds: a qualifier and a final. In the qualifier, each shooter fired 40 shots with an air pistol at 10 metres distance. Scores for each shot were in increments of 1, with a maximum score of 10.

The top 8 shooters in the qualifying round moved on to the final round. There, they fired an additional 10 shots. These shots scored in increments of .1, with a maximum score of 10.9. The total score from all 50 shots was used to determine final ranking.

Records
Prior to this competition, the existing world and Olympic records were as follows.

Both Olympic records were broken during the competition: the qualification record was raised to 391 by Natalia Paderina and the final record to 492.3 (390+102.3) by Guo Wenjun.

Qualification round

DNF Did not finish – OR Olympic record – Q Qualified for final

Final

OR Olympic record

References

Shooting at the 2008 Summer Olympics
Olymp
Women's events at the 2008 Summer Olympics